A Merry Little Christmas was recorded during the Mormon Tabernacle Choir's 2017 Christmas shows in the LDS Conference Center, featuring vocalist Sutton Foster and actor Hugh Bonneville.  An album and concert DVD was released on October 12, 2018. The recorded concert premiered on PBS on December 17, 2018 and BYUtv on December 20, 2018.

Track listing

References

2018 Christmas albums
Christmas albums by American artists
Tabernacle Choir albums